Qul (Yaghnobi: Қӯл) is a village in Sughd Region, northwestern Tajikistan. The village is part of the jamoat Anzob in the Ayni District. Its population was 60 in 2007.

Notes

References

Populated places in Sughd Region
Yaghnob